The 1804 Almería earthquake was a highly destructive seismic event in the Province of Almería, southern Spain. It occurred on August 25 at 8:25 pm local time. The mainshock had a maximum intensity assigned VIII–IX on the European macroseismic scale (EMS), and an estimated moment magnitude of 6.2–6.4 . At least 400 people were reported killed.

Tectonic setting
Southern Spain is located within a zone of compression caused by the complex convergence between the Nubian and Iberian plates. The plate boundary location remains poorly defined. Seismicity is high in a  zone known as the Eastern Betics Shear Zone. Moderately large earthquakes greater than magnitude 4.5 are infrequent, but have been destructive. Almería experienced heavy damage during the earthquakes of 1487, 1522, 1658, 1804 and 1910. The earthquakes associated with these faults display reverse and left-lateral slip.

Earthquake
Earthquakes in the Almería region are associated with shallow faulting on northwest–southeast and north–south trending faults. Offshore thrust faulting was likely associated with the 1522 event. Prior to the mainshock in August, a strong earthquake was also reported in the region on January 13, 1804. The town sustained damage that corresponded to VII–VIII on the EMS scale. It had a moment magnitude estimated to be 6.3. Based on the macroseismic data available, the approximate epicenter would likely be in the Alboran Sea or near the heavily damaged town of Dalías. The offshore epicenter location was given as 36.6°N, 2.8°W, while the onshore location was 36.80°N, 2.85°W, with moment magnitudes of 6.2 and 6.4, respectively.

Damage
The town of Dalías experienced the greatest damage and loss. All the buildings in the town were destroyed, and 267 people were killed. Damage corresponded to VIII–IX on the EMS scale. Within 45 minutes of the mainshock, three strong aftershocks and many weaker ones were felt. Five shocks were felt at Albuñol. Homes were damaged in Rochetta. A total of 2,500 homes were heavily damaged or destroyed and over 4,000 were slightly damaged.

In Berja, homes collapsed, while the walls and towers of churches toppled. An estimated 36–45 people died in the town. Many were killed while fleeing from buildings. In the flat plains, heavy damage was reported, many buildings were left in a state of ramshackle. The Temple of the Annunciation, a parish in the city, as well as several buildings were in shambles.

The city of Almería was subjected to VII intensity shaking, causing buildings to crack. Many residents became fearful, and the local government had to impose new regulations to maintain orderly conduct. Religious activities were prohibited in the Al-Andalusian palatial complex and neighborhood of San Esteban due to debris on the streets.

Four deaths and many injuries were recorded in Canjáyar. A total of 60 homes were destroyed. In the aftermath, 120 additional homes and a church were to be demolished. Collapses also occurred in Roquetas de Mar, where the seismic intensity was evaluated to be VIII. The town hall and church sustained cracks on its floors. The church of Adra was damaged but remained open. The two upper sections of the church were demolished and reconstructed.

Significant damage was observed in the Alpujarras. At Turón, homes had to be demolished. Many structures in Albuñol were affected, including the towers of a church. Fissures and landslides occurred on the nearby mountainsides. However, there were only two injuries. One home was destroyed in Ohanes. Landslides caused additional damage to buildings.

According to government information, the official death toll was 173, but a work published by Instituto Geográfico Nacional suggested the actual death toll exceeded 200. A total death toll of 400 was totaled in the towns of Berja, Canjáyar, Roquetas de Mar and Dalías. The Gaceta de Madrid cited a death toll of 407. The heavy losses resulted in the government granting tax exemptions to the populations of Almería, Berja, Dalias, Vícar, Roquetas, Canjáyar, Adra, Ugíjar, Motril and Turón.

See also
List of earthquakes in Spain

References

1804 disasters in Europe
Earthquakes in Spain
1804 in Spain
Geography of the Province of Almería
History of Andalusia
1804 earthquakes